Milli- is the SI prefix for one thousandth (10−3, symbol m)

Milli may also refer to:

Milli (rapper) (born 2002), Thai rapper
Milli, a character in Team Umizoomi
Birinci Milli, a village in Azerbaijan, also known as Milli
"A Milli", a 2008 song by Lil Wayne
Milli Bus, a government-run bus service operating across Afghanistan
Milli Fire, wildfire in Oregon forest during the summer of 2017

People with the given name Milli 
Milli Jannides (born 1986), Australian-born New Zealand artist
Michael Milli Husein, South Sudanese politician

People with the surname Milli 
Camillo Milli (born 1929), Italian stage, film and television actor
Emin Milli (born 1979), Azerbaijani writer and human rights activist
Matteo Milli (born 1989), Italian swimmer
Robert Milli (born 1933), American television actor

See also
Milli Vanilli, German R&B duo from Munich consisting of Fab Morvan and Rob Pilatus
Milli-Q, a trademark created by Millipore Corporation to describe 'ultrapure' water of "Type 1"
Mili (disambiguation)
Millie (disambiguation)
Milly (disambiguation)
Millis (disambiguation)
Millis (surname)